The Billboard 200, published in Billboard magazine, is a weekly chart that ranks the highest-selling music albums and EPs in the United States. These data are compiled by Nielsen SoundScan from a database of merchants that represents more than 90% of the U.S. music retail market. The sample includes not only music stores and the music departments at electronics and department stores, but also direct-to-consumer transactions and internet sales (both physical albums and the ones bought via digital downloads).

There were 23 number-one albums on this chart in 1999, including Garth Brook's Double Live which, starting in early December 1998, spent a consecutive run of five weeks at the top of the chart. Rapper DMX' Flesh of My Flesh, Blood of My Blood debuted at number one, making it his second album that debuted at the top of the chart. Pop singer Britney Spears's first album ...Baby One More Time peaked at number one for six non-consecutive weeks. Certified as diamond by the Recording Industry Association of America (RIAA), it made her the youngest artist that reach the ten million sales mark and the top selling female act of 1999. TLC's third album, Fanmail, the year's top selling hip-hop album, remained at number one for five weeks and won the Grammy Award for Best R&B Album at the 42nd Grammy Awards.

I Am…, the third studio album by rapper Nas, stayed at the top of the chart for two weeks and has been certified double platinum by the RIAA. Puerto Rican pop singer Ricky Martin's eponymous set achieved sales of six million copies, making it the year's top-selling album by a solo male artist. Millennium by vocal group Backstreet Boys spent ten weeks at number one on the chart, selling 1,130,000 copies in its first week of release, establishing a new record for the largest sales in a single week since Nielsen SoundScan began tracking sales in 1991. Millennium became the best-selling album of 1999, with sales of over 11 million copies. The album also received an Album of the Year and a Best Pop Vocal Album nomination at the Grammy Awards. Nu metal band Limp Bizkit released their second album Significant Other, which debuted at number one and sold over five million copies by the end of the year; this helped push Limp Bizkit's first album past the platinum mark. Pop/R&B singer Christina Aguilera's self-titled debut album was released in August 1999. Its lead single "Genie in a Bottle" reached the top of the singles chart for five weeks, which helped the album reach the number one position in September, selling five million copies by January 2000.

Fly by the country group Dixie Chicks peaked at number one for two weeks, making them the first country group to reach the top of the Billboard 200; the album received the Grammy Award for Best Country Album. Human Clay, the second album by post-grunge band Creed, became a hit, entering the charts at number one and selling ten million copies over the next two years. Latin rock band Santana's Supernatural, was the longest-running number-one album of the year, topping the chart for twelve non-consecutive weeks,  three of which were in 1999, making it his first number-one album in 28 years.  The album sold five million copies in 1999 and won two Grammy Awards for Best Rock Album and for Album of the Year.
Breathe, the fourth album by country artist Faith Hill, entered the charts at number one upon its release in late 1999. Its title track became Hill's biggest hit, topping the country and the adult contemporary singles charts; the album sold five million copies by the end of 2000 and won the Grammy Award for Best Country Album at the 43rd Grammy Awards. Born Again by The Notorious B.I.G. was the second posthumous album by the rapper to reach number-one on the albums chart, and the seventh posthumous title to reach the top during the 1990s.

Chart history

See also
1999 in music
List of number-one albums (United States)

References

1999
1999 record charts